Khlong Tan Nuea is a khwaeng (subdistrict) of Watthana District, in Bangkok, Thailand. In 2020, it had a total population of 49,971 people.

Toponymy
Its name means "North Khlong Tan", according to its direction. Khlong Tan is a tributary on the left side of Khlong Saen Saep, the longest  khlong (canal) in Thailand was excavated in the early Rattanakosin period around the reign of King Rama III that flows through this vicinity.

Khlong Saen Saep confluence Khlong Tan in the area like a three way junction. Hence, this vicinity was called Khlong Tan as well.

References

Subdistricts of Bangkok
Watthana district